Heterotrophic nutrition is a mode of nutrition in which organisms depend upon other organisms for food to survive. They can't make their own food like Green plants. Heterotrophic organisms have to take in all the organic substances they need to survive.

All animals, certain types of fungi, and non-photosynthesizing plants are heterotrophic. In contrast, green plants, red algae, brown algae, and cyanobacteria are all autotrophs, which use photosynthesis to produce their own food from sunlight. Some fungi may be saprotrophic, meaning they will extracellularly secrete enzymes onto their food to be broken down into smaller, soluble molecules which can diffuse back into the fungus.

Description
All eukaryotes except for green plants are unable to manufacture their own food: They obtain food from other organisms. This mode of nutrition is also known as heterotrophic nutrition.

All heterotrophs (except blood and gut parasites) have to convert solid food into soluble compounds which are capable of being absorbed (digestion).Then the soluble products of digestion for the organism are being broken down for the release of energy (respiration). All heterotrophs depend on autotrophs for their nutrition. Heterotrophic organisms have only four types of nutrition.

Footnotes

References

Trophic ecology
Biological interactions